Acanthogalea is a genus of trematodes in the family Lepocreadiidae.

Species
The following species are included in the genus, according to the World Register of Marine Species:
 Acanthogalea gibsoni Gaevskaya, 1983
 Acanthogalea palinurichthydis Gibson, 1976

References

Plagiorchiida
Trematode genera